A Private Storm is a 2010 Nigerian romantic drama film, co-directed by Lancelot Oduwa Imasuen and Ikechukwu Onyeka. It stars Ramsey Nouah, Omotola Jalade Ekeinde, Ngozi Ezeonu, Ufuoma Ejenobor and John Dumelo. It was premiered on 18 December 2010 at Four Points Hotel, Lekki.

Plot
Gina (Omotola Jalade Ekeinde) and Alex (Ramsey Nouah) seem like the ideal couple from the outside, but the urge to always be in control of all aspect of Gina's life is threatening their relationship. Alex abuses her emotionally and physically anytime he sees her getting close to the opposite sex.

Cast
Ramsey Nouah as Alex
Omotola Jolade-Ekeinde as Gina
Ufuoma Ejenobor as Lisa
John Dumelo as Jason
Ngozi Ezeonu as Mrs Jibuno
Blossom Chukwujekwu as Tony
Tessy Oragwa as Katie
Christian Ajisafe as Uju
Blessing Onwukwe as Ada

Release
It premiered in Lagos on 18 December 2010. It was released theatrically on 9 February 2011 and on DVD on 10 December 2012.

Reception

Critical reception
The film received a generally positive reception. It holds a 57% rating on Nollywood Reinvented, who praised the acting, music, story and originality. Nollywood Forever also praised the casting and storyline.

Accolades
It was nominated in seven categories at the 2012 Nollywood Movies Awards. It received seven nominations at the 2011 Best of Nollywood Awards and won the award for "Best Use of Costume". It received three nominations at the 7th Africa Movie Academy Awards including awards for Best Makeup, Best Supporting Actor and Best Nigerian Film

References

External links

Nigerian romantic drama films
Films set in Lagos
2010 romantic drama films
2010 films
Films about domestic violence
Nigerian nonlinear narrative films
Films set in Abuja